WANY may refer to:

 WANY-FM, a radio station (100.9 FM) licensed to serve Albany, Kentucky, United States
 WANY (AM), a defunct radio station (1390 AM) formerly licensed to serve Albany, Kentucky